Alibi perfetto (English: The perfect alibi) is a 1992 Italian thriller film directed by Aldo Lado.

Plot
Tony and Lisa, two policemen of the special team, have long been on the trail of Mancini and his men, involved in drug trafficking. Finally, they defeat a large part of the gang by seizing the heroin during a shooting in a Chinese restaurant, but Mancini manages to escape. Elvi, Tony's wife from whom she is separated, asks to settle in his apartment (promising to find him a new accommodation) and in the meantime takes some photos of an abandoned villa for her real estate agency. When Elvi and Tony meet over the divorce lawsuit, the woman is shot and killed.

Cast
Michael Woods: Tony Giordani
Kay Sandvik: Lisa Bonetti
Annie Girardot: Beaumont
Carla Cassola: Yarno
Gianna Paola Scaffidi: Elvi Giordani
Philippe Leroy: police chief
Burt Young: Mancini

Production
The film was one of the last productions of the film company P.A.C. before its bankruptcy.

Reception
The film was a commercial failure, grossing less than 25 millions lire at the Italian box office.
 The film was generally badly received by critics. In a contemporary review film critic Stefano Martina described the film structure as "elementary and sketchy". Morando Morandini referred to the film as an "insipid thriller with psychological pretensions and poorly used actors" In his analysis of the film the critic Fabrizio Fogliato was more benevolent, calling it "a decent product (but nothing more)".

References

External links 

1992 films
1992 thriller films
Italian thriller films
1990s Italian-language films
Films directed by Aldo Lado